Strange Clouds may refer to:

 Strange Clouds (album), a 2012 album by B.o.B
 "Strange Clouds" (song), the album's title song, released in 2011

See also 
 List of cloud types